6-Methyl-3,4-methylenedioxyamphetamine (6-Methyl-MDA) is an entactogen and psychedelic drug of the amphetamine class. It was first synthesized in the late 1990s by a team including David E. Nichols at Purdue University while investigating derivatives of 3,4-methylenedioxyamphetamine (MDA) and 3,4-methylenedioxy-N-methylamphetamine (MDMA).

6-Methyl-MDA has IC50 values of 783 nM, 28,300 nM, and 4,602 nM for inhibiting the reuptake of serotonin, dopamine, and norepinephrine in rat synaptosomes. In animal studies it substitutes for MBDB, MMAI, LSD, and 2,5-dimethoxy-4-iodoamphetamine (DOI), though not amphetamine, but only partially and at high doses. Thus, while several-fold less potent than its analogues 2-methyl-MDA and 5-methyl-MDA, and approximately half as potent as MDA, 6-methyl-MDA is still significantly active, and appropriate doses may be similar to or somewhat higher than those of MDMA.

References 

Substituted amphetamines
Benzodioxoles
Entactogens and empathogens
Serotonin-norepinephrine releasing agents
Substances discovered in the 1990s